The canton of Saint-Just-en-Chevalet is a French former administrative division located in the department of Loire and the Rhône-Alpes region. It was disbanded following the French canton reorganisation which came into effect in March 2015. It consisted of 10 communes, which joined the canton of Renaison in 2015. It had 4,655 inhabitants (2012).

The canton comprised the following communes:

Champoly
Chausseterre
Cherier
Cremeaux
Juré
Saint-Just-en-Chevalet
Saint-Marcel-d'Urfé
Saint-Priest-la-Prugne
Saint-Romain-d'Urfé
La Tuilière

See also
Cantons of the Loire department

References

Former cantons of Loire (department)
2015 disestablishments in France
States and territories disestablished in 2015